Moler is a surname. Notable people with the surname include:

Cleve Moler (born 1939), American mathematician and computer programmer
Janja Moler (1780-1841), Serbian iconographer 
Janko Mihailović Moler (1792–1853), Serbian priest and artist
Kathryn Moler (born 1966), American physicist
Petar Nikolajević Moler (1775–1816), Serbian politician

See also
Moller
Moser (surname)